Pete Sampras defeated Gilad Bloom 7–6, 7–6 in the final to secure the title.

Seeds

Draw

Finals

Section 1

Section 2

External links
 1990 Manchester Open Singles draw

Singles